Klatter is the third collaborative studio album and sixth release by the Japanese experimental rock band Boris and Japanese noise musician Merzbow. The album features re-recorded versions of "Akuma no Uta" and "Naki Kyoku" from Akuma no Uta, and a cover of the song "Jane" by the German progressive rock group of the same name. It was originally planned for release on Troubleman Unlimited in 2007 under the unconfirmed title Mellow Peak, but for unknown reasons, the release did not happen.

Track listing

Personnel
All personnel credits adapted from the album notes.
Boris with Merzbow
 Takeshi – vocals, bass, guitar
 Wata – guitar
 Atsuo – drums, vocals
 Masami Akita – computer
Technical personnel
 Fangsanalsatan – recording, artwork
 Souichiro Nakamura – mixing

Release history

References

External links
 
 

Collaborative albums
2011 albums
Boris (band) albums
Merzbow albums